The Manchester School of Technology (MST) is a school located at 100 Gerald Connors Circle, in Manchester, New Hampshire, United States. A part of the Manchester School District, the school is focused on applied applications of programs of study, rather than the theoretical or abstract. The teachers for the programs are all experts in their fields, having worked in the field and bringing their own job experience to their classes. Even the classrooms themselves are designed to function in a manner similar to their real world counterparts.

Currently it is its own high school. Until the establishment of the dedicated high school in 2012 it only had part-time 11th and 12th grade students who primarily attended other schools.

Courses 
Business/Marketing
Applied Business Management
Academy of Finance
Sports & Entertainment Marketing
Communications
Design Communication
Graphic and Game Design
Video Production
Construction
Landscape / Horticulture
Electrical Technology
Residential Carpentry
Residential Plumbing & HVAC
Mechanical/Technology
Automotive Technology
Collision Repair / Refinish Technology
Architecture & Civil Engineering
Manufacturing Technology
Services
Early Childhood Education
Cosmetology
Culinary Arts
Basic Culinary
Public Safety
Health Science Technology Education

References

External links 
 Manchester School of Technology official website

Schools in Manchester, New Hampshire
Public high schools in New Hampshire